Iowa's 10th congressional district existed from 1883 to 1933, when Iowa sent eleven congressmen to the United States House of Representatives.  The district, known as "The Big Tenth," covered large areas of north-central Iowa.

Makeup
From 1883 to 1886, the district included the north-central Iowa counties of Worth, Cerro Gordo, Franklin, Hardin, Story, Wright, Hamilton, Humboldt, Hancock, Kossuth, Winnebago, Webster, and Boone.  Reapportionment in 1886 reflected the increasing population balance between eastern and western Iowa, resulting in a westward shift of the district's boundaries.  From 1886 until 1933, the district was made up of Boone, Calhoun, Carroll, Crawford, Emmet, Greene, Hamilton, Humboldt, Kossuth, Palo Alto, Pocahontas, Winnebago, and Webster counties. After 1886, the boundaries of the district never changed; the Iowa General Assembly refused to reapportion its districts until the loss of two seats following the 1930 census left the State with no other choice.

Demographics and underrepresentation
The district was predominantly rural, especially in its 1886 reconfiguration.  During that period, it included only one of Iowa's twenty largest cities — Fort Dodge — and included counties that had been relatively slow to settle.  However, by 1895 the large area of the 10th District, coupled with increased migration to its small towns, caused it to have the largest population of any of Iowa's congressional districts. By 1890, the continued disproportionate increase in the population of the 10th and 11th Districts caused some to predict that the General Assembly would need to reduce the area of each district, but no such change occurred.  By 1921, the 10th District had over 100,000 more residents than the 1st District, and nearly 60,000 more than the population of an ideally-sized Iowa congressional district.

Voting patterns
Every congressman elected from this district was a member of the Republican Party. As a general matter, the most influential event during each election year was not the November general election, but the Republican Party's district nominating convention (or later, the Republican primary). Two 10th district congressmen (Jonathan P. Dolliver and L. J. Dickinson) became well-known members of the U.S. Senate and sought national office.

After dissolution
Under the nine-district plan adopted by the Iowa General Assembly in 1931, the boundaries of the old 10th district were preserved as the new 8th district. The last congressman elected by the old 10th district, Fred C. Gilchrist, was elected in the new 8th district in 1932. Ten years later, when the 1940 census caused Iowa to lose another seat, the new 6th district included all of the old 10th district's counties, plus Wright County.  It was only after that district elected a Democrat (Merwin Coad from Boone County) and Iowa lost a seat due to the 1960 census that the Iowa General Assembly broke up the old 10th district's counties, dividing them among four districts.

List of members representing the district

See also
Iowa's congressional districts

References

 Congressional Biographical Directory of the United States 1774–present

06
Former congressional districts of the United States
1883 establishments in Iowa
1933 disestablishments in Iowa